ERGO (ERGO Group) is a group of insurance companies owned by Munich Re. ERGO is one of the largest insurance groups in Europe. It operates in over 30 countries, especially in Europe and Asia. In Europe, ERGO claims to be number 1 in the health and legal expenses insurance segments, and in its home market of Germany it is among the market leaders. It has over 40,000 full-time employees.

Main activities 

ERGO Group is one of the largest German insurance companies. Its activities include life insurance, health insurance, non-life and casualty insurance, legal expenses insurance, travel insurance, and financial services.

The main activities of the group focus on private clients, company pension schemes, and medium-sized business. In Europe, ERGO is the first in health and legal expenses insurance; in its home market Germany ERGO claims to belong to the market leaders in all lines of business. The company consists of:

 D.A.S.
 
 ERGO Life Insurance (formerly Hamburg-Mannheimer)
 ERGO Insurance (formerly Victoria)
 Vereinsbank Victoria Bauspar
 Europäische Reiseversicherung AG (ERV)
 ERGO Direkt Versicherungen (formerly KarstadtQuelle Versicherungen)
 MEAG - Munich Ergo AssetManagement (capital investment company of ERGO)
 Vorsorge Lebensversicherung AG
 ITERGO (IT services provider of Ergo)

Outside of Germany, ERGO Group operates in over 30 countries. The foreign participations are mostly bundled in ERGO International AG. ERGO is mostly active in Southern, Middle and Eastern Europe and Asia.

ERGO Group changed the structure of its group in late 2010 to offer non-life and life insurances in Germany under the ERGO brand. The direct insurer KarstadtQuelle Versicherungen was renamed ERGO Direkt Versicherungen, health insurance was consolidated under the trademark DKV, and legal expenses insurance was put under the trademark D.A.S. The trademark ERV will remain in business for travel insurance. The trademarks Victoria and Hamburg-Mannheimer were removed from the market.

History 

ERGO Group AG came into being at the end of 1997 by the fusion of Victoria Holding AG and Hamburg-Mannheimer AG; the latter evolved from Hamburg-Mannheimer Versicherungs-AG, the life insurance company of Hamburg-Mannheimer-Gruppe.

On December 1, 1997, the shareholders of Victoria Holding AG that was formerly listed on the stock exchange, approved the transfer of the whole property of their companies to ERGO Group AG. Every nominal share of Victoria could be exchanged for ten bearer shares of ERGO. Victoria Holding AG disappeared from the stock exchange after the closure of the transaction on February 2, 1998; its place in MDAX was taken by Ergo Group AG.

On April 1, 2001  the majority shareholder Münchener Rück (today Munich Re) announced an exchange offer to the shareholders of ERGO, in the framework of which two shares of ERGO could be exchanged for one share of Münchener Rück plus cash payment of 18 Euros. After the offer had expired in July 2001, the shares of ERGO left the MDAX due to the reduced free float.

ERGO Versicherungsgruppe AG was renamed "ERGO Group AG" in April 2016.

Share capital 

On the balance sheet day December 31, 2006 the share capital of ERGO Group AG totaled €192,279,504.20, divided in 75,492,117 bearer shares 2.60 € each. The shares of ERGO Group AG are listed on the stock exchange under WKN 841852 and ISIN DE0008418526. 94.7% (since November 25, 2009 99.69% with the purpose to raise the participation to 100% by means of the so-called squeeze out) of the shares belong to Munich Re.

References

External links
 

Financial services companies established in 1997
Insurance companies of Germany
Companies based in Düsseldorf